Kisbeszterce is a village in Hegyhát District, northern Baranya county, in the Southern Transdanubia region of Hungary. Its population at the 2011 census was 89.

Geography 
It is part of the Southern Transdanubia statistical region, and administratively it falls under Baranya County and Hegyhát District.

Demographics

2011 census 
As of the census of 2011, there were 89 residents, 35 households, and 25 families living in the village. The population density was 31 inhabitants per square mile (12/km2). There were 36 dwellings at an average density of 13 per square mile (5/km2). The average household size was 2.40. The average number of children was 0.96. The average family size was 2.80.

Religious affiliation was 92.9% Roman Catholic and 6.0% unaffiliated, with 1.2% declining to answer.

The village had an ethnic minority Roma population of 4.8%. All residents declared themselves as Hungarian (100%).

Local government 
The village is governed by a mayor with a two-person council. The local government of the village operates a joint council office with the nearby localities of Bakóca, Baranyajenő, Kishajmás, Mindszentgodisa, Szágy, and Tormás. The seat of the joint council is in Mindszentgodisa.

Transportation

Railway 
The station is on the Pusztaszabolcs–Pécs and Dombóvár-Komló railway lines and is operated by MÁV.

External links 
 Street map 
 OpenStreetMap
 Detailed Gazetteer of Hungary

Notes

References

Populated places in Baranya County